Rossville is an unincorporated community in eastern Butler County, in the U.S. state of Missouri. It is located on Missouri Route 51 between Batesville to the south and Fisk to the north. It is approximately 7.5 miles east of Poplar Bluff.

The community was named after Mrs. Ross, an early citizen.

References

Unincorporated communities in Butler County, Missouri
Unincorporated communities in Missouri